Nathaniel James Perkins (March 31, 1887 – April 20, 1962) was an American educator and politician who served as president of Fork Union Military Academy from 1918 to 1930 and as its headmaster from 1930 to 1948. He served from 1936 to 1942 in the Virginia House of Delegates.

References

External links 

1887 births
1962 deaths
Democratic Party members of the Virginia House of Delegates
20th-century American politicians